Karl Stirner (4 November 1882, Rosenberg - 21 June 1943, Schwäbisch Hall) was a German painter, watercolorist, illustrator and writer.

Life and work 

He came from a family of handymen and farmers. His father went to America before he was born, and disappeared. His mother, Josepha, made her living as a maid. After completing his primary education, in 1896, he was apprenticed to a decorative painter and carpenter named Severin Weber, in Ellwangen.  While there, he also took drawing classes in the evening.

Following the death of his mother, in 1899, their home had to auctioned off and he was destitute, so he became a journeyman painter and began the customary wanderjahre. After his return in 1906, thansk to a scholarship, he briefly attended the Kunstgewerbeschule in Stuttgart, where he studied with the graphic artist, . Overall, however, he was dissatisfied with the courses there.

His first major success came in 1913 with the illustrations for Das Stuttgarter Hutzelmännlein, a fairy tale by Eduard Mörike. That same year, in an effort to improve his chronic bronchitis, he took a trip to Algeria. After returning, he had to enter a hospital in Agra, Switzerland, for treatment. While there, he met Hermann Hesse, and became a member of his "Library for German Prisoners of War". 

He also met the Expressionist painter, Ernst Ludwig Kirchner, who had a significant influence on his future artistic development. After the war, in 1919, he worked with Kirchner in the Alps, near Davos. He then made several visits to Sicily, where he tried out his new color palette painting landscapes.

In 1921, he returned to Germany and settled in Ellwangen. There, he married Pauline Wagner, and they had four children. started a family and began to write poems and stories, accompanied by his own illustrations. He made a second trip to Algeria in 1929, and accompanied his friend, the church painter , on a tour of Palestine. He returned in 1932, and was commissioned to illustrate the primer for the Catholic elementary schools in Württemberg, which was reprinted for many decades.

During the 1930s, his lung condition worsened and eventually prevented him from working.

References

Further reading 
 Hermann Hauber: Karl Stirner – Der schwäbische Malerpoet, Ellwangen: Schwabenverlag, 1988  
 Hermann Hauber: Karl Stirner und Alois Schenk im Heiligen Land, Stuttgart: Betulius Verlag, 2005 
 Max Schefold: "Stirner, Karl", In: Hans Vollmer (Ed.): Allgemeines Lexikon der Bildenden Künstler von der Antike bis zur Gegenwart, Vol.32: Stephens–Theodotos. E. A. Seemann, Leipzig 1938, pg.66
 "Stirner, Karl", In: Hans Vollmer (Ed.): Allgemeines Lexikon der bildenden Künstler des XX. Jahrhunderts. Vol.4: Q–U. E. A. Seemann, Leipzig 1958

External links 

 More works by Stirner @ ArtNet
 
 Eduard Mörike: Das Stuttgarter Hutzelmännlein, with illustrations by Stirner @ the Russian State Library

1882 births
1943 deaths
German painters
German illustrators
German watercolourists
Deaths from lung disease
People from Ostalbkreis